The Chalky Island, part of the Big Green Group within the Furneaux Group,  is a  unpopulated granite island with limestone outcrops and dolerite dykes, located in the Bass Strait, west of the Flinders Island, in Tasmania, in south-eastern Australia. The island is contained within a conservation area and is part of the Chalky, Big Green and Badger Island Groups Important Bird Area.

Fauna
Recorded breeding seabird and wader species are little penguin, short-tailed shearwater, white-faced storm petrel, Pacific gull, silver gull, sooty oystercatcher, pied oystercatcher, black-faced cormorant, Caspian tern and fairy tern.  Reptiles present include the metallic Skink, White's skink, white-lipped snake and tiger snake.

See also

 List of islands of Tasmania

References

Furneaux Group
Important Bird Areas of Tasmania
Islands of Bass Strait
Islands of North East Tasmania